The 2022 North Texas Mean Green football team represented the University of North Texas as a member of Conference USA (C-USA) during the 2022 NCAA Division I FBS football season. They were led by seventh-year head coach Seth Littrell. The Mean Green played their home games at Apogee Stadium in Denton, Texas.

Previous season
The 2021 team started the season 1–6, before winning five games in a row to finish the regular season with a record of 6–6. The team went 5–3 in conference play to finish in third place in Conference USA's West Division. The Mean Green were invited to the inaugural Frisco Football Classic, losing 14–27 to the Miami RedHawks, finishing the season with an overall record of 6–7. 

On October 21, 2021, North Texas accepted the invitation to join the American Athletic Conference (AAC) and will become a full-member on July 1, 2023. The 2022 season is expected to be the program's last season as a member of Conference USA.

Preseason

C-USA media day
The Conference USA media day was held on July 27 at Globe Life Field in Arlington, Texas. The Mean Green were represented by head coach Seth Littrell, tight end Jake Roberts, and linebacker K. D. Davis. The Mean Green were predicted to finish fifth in the conference's preseason poll.

Schedule
North Texas and Conference USA announced the 2022 football schedule on March 30, 2022.

Game summaries

at UTEP

SMU

Texas Southern

at UNLV

at Memphis

Florida Atlantic

Louisiana Tech

at UTSA

at Western Kentucky

FIU

at UAB

Rice

at UTSA (C-USA Championship)

Boise State (Frisco Bowl)

References

North Texas
North Texas Mean Green football seasons
North Texas Mean Green football